"Hold On" is a song recorded by Swedish singer Måns Zelmerlöw, released as a digital download  on 18 May 2009 in Sweden. It was released as the second (third overall) single from his second studio album MZW (2009). The song was written by David Clewett, Jason Gill and Måns Zelmerlöw. It peaked to number 22 on the Swedish Singles Chart.

Track listing

Charts

Weekly charts

Release history

References

2009 singles
2009 songs
Måns Zelmerlöw songs
English-language Swedish songs
Songs written by Jason Gill (musician)
Songs written by Måns Zelmerlöw